Elisabeth of Luxembourg (1409–1442) was queen consort of Germany, Hungary and Bohemia.

Elisabeth (or Elizabeth) of Luxembourg may also refer to: 
Isabelle of Luxembourg (1247–1298), second wife of Guy of Dampierre, daughter of Count Henry V
Elizabeth of Bohemia (1292–1330), wife of John the Blind (John of Luxembourg), mother of Charles IV
Elisabeth of Bohemia (1358–1373), first wife of Albert III, Duke of Austria, daughter of Charles IV, Holy Roman Emperor
Elisabeth of Pomerania (1347–1393), 4th wife of Charles IV, mother of Sigismund
Elisabeth, Duchess of Luxembourg (1390–1451), reigning duchess of Luxembourg, also known as Elisabeth of Görlitz
Princess Elisabeth of Luxembourg (1901–1950), daughter of Grand Duke Wilhelm IV, wife of Prince Ludwig Philipp of Thurn and Taxis
Princess Elisabeth, Duchess of Hohenberg (1922–2011), daughter of Grand Duchess Charlotte, wife of Franz, Duke of Hohenberg

See also
Elisabeth of Bohemia (disambiguation)